This is the full table of the medal table of the 1956 Summer Olympics in Melbourne, Australia and Stockholm, Sweden (equestrian events). 

These rankings sort by the number of gold medals earned by a country. The number of silvers is taken into consideration next and then the number of bronze. If, after the above, countries are still tied, equal ranking is given and they are listed alphabetically. This follows the system used by the IOC, IAAF and BBC.

The Netherlands, Spain, and Switzerland (Soviet invasion of Hungary), Egypt, Iraq, and Lebanon (Suez Crisis) and the People's Republic of China (participation of Taiwan) boycotted the games, but some of them took part in the equestrian events in Stockholm.

An additional bronze medal not included in the above Wikipedia table was presented to John Ian Wing, an Australian resident, for advocating that the closing ceremony have athletes march as one nation.

References

External links
 
 
 

Medal count
1956